Kirpichyovsky is a rural locality (a khutor) in Galushkinskoye Rural Settlement, Novoanninsky District, Volgograd Oblast, Russia. The population was 87 as of 2010. There are 2 streets.

Geography 
Kirpichyovsky is located 43 km north of Novoanninsky (the district's administrative centre) by road. Chelyshevsky is the nearest rural locality.

References 

Rural localities in Novoanninsky District